Origin(s) or The Origin may refer to:

Arts, entertainment, and media

Comics and manga

 Origin (comics), a Wolverine comic book mini-series published by Marvel Comics in 2002
 The Origin (Buffy comic), a 1999 Buffy the Vampire Slayer comic book series
 Origins (Judge Dredd story), a major Judge Dredd storyline running from 2006 through 2007
 Origin (manga), a 2016 manga by Boichi
 Mobile Suit Gundam: The Origin, a 2002 manga by Yoshikazu Yasuhiko
 Wolverine: Origins, a Marvel Comics series

Films and television
 Origin (TV series), 2018 science-fiction TV series
 "Origin" (Angel), a fifth-season episode of Angel
 Origin: Spirits of the Past, a 2006 anime movie also known as Gin-iro no Kami no Agito
 Origin (Stargate), the religion of the Ori
 "Origin" (Stargate SG-1), a ninth-season episode of Stargate SG-1
 X-Men Origins: Wolverine, a 2009 superhero film, prequel to the X-Men film trilogy
 Origins: The Journey of Humankind, a National Geographic TV series
 "The Origin" (Dark), episode 4 of season 3 of the Dark TV series
 The Origin (film), a 2022 British film

Gaming
 Origin (service), a video game digital distribution service and platform from Electronic Arts
 Origin Systems, a former video game developer
 Origin, King of the Summon Spirits in Tales of Phantasia and its prequel, Tales of Symphonia
 Origins, spirits that are attached to The Mystics in Legaia 2: Duel Saga
 Origins Award, presented by the Academy of Adventure Gaming Arts and Design at the Origins Game Fair
 Origins Game Fair, an annual board game event in Columbus, Ohio
 Assassin's Creed Origins, part of the Assassin's Creed franchise
 Batman: Arkham Origins, part of the Batman game franchise
 Dragon Age: Origins, a 2009 role-playing video game and first installment of the Dragon Age series
 F.E.A.R. 2: Project Origin, the sequel to F.E.A.R. by Monolith
 Rayman Origins, a 2011 installment in the Rayman series
 Silent Hill: Origins, the fifth installment of the Silent Hill survival horror series and prequel to the original 1999 game
 Origins, the final zombies map released for Call of Duty: Black Ops 2
 Origin, the final dungeon of Xenoblade Chronicles 3

Literature

Fiction
 Origin (Baxter novel), a 2001 science fiction book by Stephen Baxter
 Origin (Brown novel), a 2017 novel by Dan Brown, the fifth installment in the Robert Langdon series
 Origin, a 2007 novel by Diana Abu-Jaber
 Origins, a fantasy novel in the Fourth World series by Kate Thompson
 The Origin (novel), a biographical novel of Charles Darwin by Irving Stone

Nonfiction
 Origins (Cato), Cato the Elder's lost work on Roman and Italian history
 Origins, a book on evolution by Richard Leakey and Roger Lewin

Music
 The Origin (Einhorn), a 2009 opera/oratorio by Richard Einhorn

Groups
 Origin (band), an American metal band formed in 1997
 The Origin (band), an American rock and power pop band 1985–1992
 Origin, a jazz group led by Chick Corea

Albums
 Origin (Borknagar album), 2006
 Origin (Dayseeker album), 2015
 Origin (Evanescence album), 2000
 Origin (Origin album), 2000
 Origin, by Omnium Gatherum, 2021
 Origin, an EP by Kelly Moran, 2019
 The Origin (album), by The Origin, 1990
 Origins (Bridge to Grace album), 2015
 Origins (Eluveitie album), 2014
 Origins (God Is an Astronaut album), 2013
 Origins (Imagine Dragons album), 2018
 , by Dan Reed Network, 2018
 Origins, by Steve Roach, 1993

Songs
 "Origin", by Neurosis from their 2007 album Given to the Rising

Periodicals
 Origin (magazine), an American poetry magazine
 Origins, a theological journal published by Catholic News Service (CNS)
 Origins, a peer-reviewed creation science journal of the Geoscience Research Institute (GRI)

Brands and enterprises
 Atos Origin, a company formed by the merger of BSO and Philips C&P (Communications & Processing) division
 Origin Energy, an Australian gas and electricity company
 Origin Enterprises, Irish agribusiness multinational 
 Origin PC, a personal computer manufacturer
 Origins (cosmetics), a plant-based skin care and fragrance company of Estée Lauder
 Toyota Origin, a limited edition Toyota automobile released in Japan
 Origin (3D printing), a San Francisco-based 3D printing company acquired by Stratasys

Philosophy and religion
 Creatio ex nihilo, Latin for "creation out of nothing", a phrase used in philosophical and theological contexts
 Creation myth, a symbolic account of how the world began and how people first came to inhabit it
 Origin myth, a story or explanation that describes the beginning of some feature of the natural or social world
 Origin story, or pourquoi story, a fictional narrative that explains why something is the way it is
 Origins, a theological journal published by Catholic News Service (CNS)

Science, technology and mathematics

Biology and medicine
 Origin (anatomy), the place or point at which a part or structure arises
 Abiogenesis, the study of how life on Earth arose from inanimate matter
 Noogenesis, the study of origin and evolution of mind
 Origin of humanity, the study of human evolution
 Origin of replication, the location at which DNA replication is initiated
 Paleoanthropology, the study of human origin
 Pedigree (dog), registered ancestry

Computing and technology
 Dalsa Origin, a digital movie camera
 Origin of a URI, as used in the Same-origin policy
 Origin (data analysis software), scientific graphing and data analysis software developed by OriginLab Corp
 Original equipment manufacturer (OEM), any company which manufactures products for another company's brand name
 SGI Origin 200, a series of entry-level MIPS-based server computers made by Silicon Graphics
 SGI Origin 2000, a series of mid-range to high-end MIPS-based server computers made by Silicon Graphics
 SGI Origin 3000, a series of mid-range to high-end MIPS-based server computers made by Silicon Graphics that succeeded the Origin 2000

Mathematics
 Origin (mathematics), a fixed point of reference for the geometry of the surrounding space
 Most commonly, the point of intersection of the axes in the Cartesian coordinate system
 Origin, the pole in the polar coordinate system

Time
 Origin, a general point in time
 Origin, an epochal date or event, see epoch
 Origin, in astronomy, an epochal moment, i.e., a reference for the orbital elements of a celestial body

Other
 Origin, in cosmogony, any theory concerning the origin of the universe
 Origin, in cosmology, the study of the universe and humanity's place in it

Sports
 City vs Country Origin, an annual Australian rugby league football match
 International Origin Match, England vs Exiles
 State of Origin series, annual best-of-three rugby league football match

Other uses
 Origin, or genealogy, the origin of families
 Origin, or etymology, the origin of words
 Origin, or toponymy, the origin of place names

See also
 Begin (disambiguation)
 Creation (disambiguation)
 Origen (disambiguation)
 Original (disambiguation)
 Point of origin (disambiguation)
 Source (disambiguation)
 Start (disambiguation)